Cooper Everett Hummel (born November 28, 1994) is an American professional baseball outfielder for the Seattle Mariners of Major League Baseball (MLB). He made his MLB debut with the Arizona Diamondbacks in 2022. Hummel played college baseball at the University of Portland.

Early life
Hummel attended Lakeridge High School in Lake Oswego, Oregon. He was a member of the Lake Oswego Little League team that advanced to the U.S. semifinals of the 2007 Little League World Series. He played three seasons of college baseball at the University of Portland.

Professional career

Milwaukee Brewers
The Milwaukee Brewers selected Hummel in the 18th round of the 2016 Major League Baseball draft. Hummel made his professional debut with the rookie-level Helena Brewers. In 2017, Hummel played for the High-A Carolina Mudcats, slashing .244/.368/.381 in 59 games. He returned to Carolina the following year and posted a slash of .260/.397/.410 with 8 home runs and 50 RBI in 103 games. In 2019, Hummel played in 121 games for the Double-A Biloxi Shuckers, hitting .249/.384/.450 with career-highs in home runs (17) and RBI (56). Hummel did not play in a game in 2020 due to the cancellation of the minor league season because of the COVID-19 pandemic. Hummel was assigned to the Triple-A Nashville Sounds to begin the 2021 season, and hit .254/.435/.508 with 6 home runs and 15 RBI.

Arizona Diamondbacks
On July 28, 2021, the Brewers traded Hummel and Alberto Ciprian to the Arizona Diamondbacks for Eduardo Escobar. Hummel finished the year with the Triple-A Reno Aces, batting .353/.429/.575 with 6 home runs and 37 RBI in 46 games. The Diamondbacks added Hummel to their 40-man roster following the 2021 season on November 19, 2021.

Hummel made his MLB debut on Opening Day on April 7, 2022, as a pinch hitter for Jake McCarthy. In an April 10 game against the San Diego Padres, Hummel recorded his first career hit and home run off of Padres reliever Javy Guerra.

Seattle Mariners
On November 17, 2022, the Diamondbacks traded Hummel to the Seattle Mariners for Kyle Lewis.

Personal life
Hummel and his wife Ashley married in 2021.

References

External links

1994 births
Living people
Baseball players from Portland, Oregon
Sportspeople from Lake Oswego, Oregon
Baseball players from Oregon
Major League Baseball outfielders
Arizona Diamondbacks players
Portland Pilots baseball players
Helena Brewers players
Carolina Mudcats players
Biloxi Shuckers players
Nashville Sounds players
Reno Aces players
Salt River Rafters players